Geneva Downtown Commercial Historic District may refer to:

 Geneva Downtown Commercial Historic District (Geneva, Indiana)
 Geneva Downtown Commercial Historic District (Geneva, New York)

See also
Central Geneva Historic District, Geneva, Illinois